Fărcașa is a commune in Maramureș County, Romania. It is composed of four villages: Buzești (Szamosújfalu), Fărcașa, Sârbi (Oláhtótfalu), and Tămaia (Tomány).

The commune is located in the western part of the county, on the border with Satu Mare County.

At the 2011 census, Fărcașa had a population of 4,015. Of those, 95.64% were ethnic Romanians and 1.54% Roma.

Natives
 Mircea Anca

References

Communes in Maramureș County